N2a cells (also known as Neuro2a cells) are a fast-growing mouse neuroblastoma cell line.

Differentiation Properties
Originating from a mouse, the N2a cell line has a neuronal and amoeboid stem cell morphology, allowing it to differentiate in response to environmental factors. The differentiated cells have many properties of neurons, including neurofilaments. The cells, due to passaging since initial collection, can exhibit responses to toxins that differ from those of neuronal cells in a live organism. Synthesizing large amounts of microtubules, N2a cells are susceptible to viruses (such as herpes simplex and poliovirus) that can alter cell morphology and physiology.

Research Applications
N2a cells have been used to study neurite outgrowth, neurotoxicity, Alzheimer's disease, asymmetric division of mammalian cell lines, adenoviral transduction, and the diagnosing of rabies.

References

External links 
 N2a at ATCC (CCL-131)
 N2a at ECACC (89121404)
 Cellosaurus entry for N2a

Rodent cell lines